The Wedding Planner is a 2001 American romantic comedy film directed by Adam Shankman, in his feature film directorial debut, written by Michael Ellis and Pamela Falk, and starring Jennifer Lopez and Matthew McConaughey.

Plot
Ambitious San Francisco wedding planner Mary Fiore is re-introduced to childhood acquaintance Massimo by her father Salvatore, who wants them to marry, but Mary declines. Hoping to persuade her boss, Geri, to make her a partner at their company, Mary is hired to plan catering heiress Fran Donolly's society wedding to long-term boyfriend "Eddie". While reporting her success on the phone, Mary's shoe heel gets stuck in a manhole cover. As she struggles to free herself, a taxicab collides with a dumpster which comes hurtling towards her. A nearby man pulls her out of the way of the speeding dumpster just in time, and she manages to thank him before fainting.

Waking up in the hospital, Mary meets her rescuer, pediatrician Steve Edison. Her colleague Penny persuades Steve to attend an outdoor movie with them, but makes up an excuse to leave the pair alone together. Mary and Steve dance, but are interrupted by a heavy downpour before they can kiss.

At a dance lesson with a client, Mary encounters Fran, who introduces her to her fiancé "Eddie", none other than Steve. Fran leaves them to dance together, and Mary angrily rebukes Steve for leading her on behind Fran's back.

Penny persuades Mary that her career is more important than her feelings and to continue planning Fran and Steve's wedding, and Steve's colleague assures him that his connection with Mary is only due to pre-wedding nerves.

On a visit to a potential wedding venue in Napa Valley, Massimo appears and, to Mary's horror, introduces himself as her fiancé. While riding through the estate with Fran's parents, Mrs. Donelly's singing frightens Mary's horse. Steve rescues Mary again and admonishes her for condemning his actions when she was also engaged.

At home, Mary scolds her father for trying to set her up with Massimo. Salvatore reveals that his marriage to her mother, which Mary has viewed as the perfect relationship, was arranged and only became a loving relationship months later, leaving Mary conflicted.

While visiting another potential venue, Fran reveals she is going on a week-long business trip and leaves Mary and Steve to continue preparations. They apologize for their angry words, and soon become friends. They run into Wendy and Keith, whom Mary reveals was once her fiancé until she caught him cheating with Wendy, his secret high-school girlfriend, on the night of their rehearsal dinner.

After getting drunk and struggling to get back into her apartment, Mary breaks down, lamenting that Keith is married and expecting a baby while she is alone and miserable. Steve manages to get Mary inside and comforts her as she sobers up, insisting that Keith was a fool to pick Wendy over her. Steve leaves, but quickly returns and confesses his feelings for Mary. She sadly replies that she respects Fran too much to let anything happen between them, and sends Steve away.

Fran confesses to Mary that she is unsure if she is still in love with Steve. Ignoring her own heart, Mary convinces Fran to continue with the wedding. At a birthday party, Massimo offers Mary a heartfelt proposal and she reluctantly accepts; the two couples prepare for their same-day weddings. Leaving Penny to coordinate the Donelly wedding, Mary goes to marry Massimo at the town hall. Steve asks Fran if they are doing the right thing, and she admits that she does not want to get married. They part as friends, Fran leaving to enjoy their honeymoon alone. Penny reveals Mary's marriage plans to Steve, and he rushes to stop her.

At the town hall, Massimo and Mary prepare to marry but her father stops the ceremony, realizing the wedding is not what Mary wants. Mary, having given up on true love, insists that life is not a fairy tale and marrying Massimo is the right thing to do, but realizes he is not the one for her and leaves.

Steve arrives to find Salvatore and Massimo, who reveals that he could not go ahead with the wedding knowing Mary was actually in love with Steve. Steve reveals his feelings to Salvatore, who tells him to go and get her. Steve and Massimo ride off on Massimo's scooter to the park, where another outdoor movie is starting. Steve finds Mary, asks her to dance, and they kiss.

Cast

Production

Casting 
The original actors set to play Mary and Steve were Jennifer Love Hewitt and Brendan Fraser, respectively. They were replaced with Sarah Michelle Gellar and Freddie Prinze Jr. Both couples eventually dropped out due to scheduling conflicts, leaving Lopez and McConaughey to be the eventual stars.

Locations
Many of the scenes were shot in Golden Gate Park, specifically at the Music Concourse (between the old De Young Museum and the old California Academy of Sciences), the Japanese Tea Garden and The Huntington Library and Gardens. The first wedding ceremony is filmed inside the chapel at Stanford University.

Reception
The Wedding Planner was released on January 26, 2001.

Box office
The Wedding Planner was screened at 2,785 theaters and grossed $13,510,293 on its opening weekend (the Super Bowl weekend), opening at number one at the box office. Jennifer Lopez's sophomore album J. Lo reached the number one spot on the Billboard 200 albums chart the same week, making Lopez the first and to-date, only person to ever achieve this feat. The film grossed $60,400,856 domestically and earned a worldwide tally of $94,728,529.

Critical reception
The Wedding Planner received generally negative reviews from critics. Based on 104 reviews collected by Rotten Tomatoes, the film has a "Rotten" rating from critics, with 16% positive reviews and an average rating of 3.9/10. The consensus reads, "Instead of being light and charming, this romantic comedy is heavy-handed and contrived in its execution. Also, it's too unoriginal." Metacritic gave the film an average score of 33 out of 100, based on 29 reviews from mainstream critics.

Entertainment Weeklys Lisa Schwarzbaum critically compared the film to My Best Friend's Wedding, writing that: "Where Julia Roberts turned the world on with her huggability, Lopez's vibe is that of someone afraid to get mussed. And where Rupert Everett was divine as a sidekick, McConaughey is mortally ordinary as a main dish who spends most of his time smiling like a party guest." Kimberly Jones of The Austin Chronicle noted that the two leading characters being mistreated was the biggest disappointment from The Wedding Planner, feeling that while Lopez and McConaughey have "enormous charisma" (referencing Lopez's work on Out of Sight (1998) as an example) the "blandness of The Wedding Planner burlap-sacks their appeal in an altogether dowdy outing for two stars who deserve much snazzier threads." A writer from The New York Times wrote that the charisma of the movie's stars along with their goofiness makes "The Wedding Planner more painless than it has a right to be." Varietys Robert Koehler described The Wedding Planner as: "an attractive bridesmaid but hardly a gorgeous bride among romantic comedies." Michael Thomson from the BBC wrote that: "Unfortunately, after the two leads become less wired in each other's presence, and the sexual tension begins to droop, everyone seems to be reading an autocue." The film was nominated for a Razzie Award for Worst Actress for Lopez.

References

External links
 
 
 

2001 films
2001 romantic comedy films
American romantic comedy films
Columbia Pictures films
2000s English-language films
Films about weddings in the United States
Films directed by Adam Shankman
Films set in San Francisco
Films shot in San Francisco
2001 directorial debut films
2000s American films